Moisés 'Moi' Gómez Bordonado (born 23 June 1994) is a Spanish professional footballer who plays for CA Osasuna as an attacking midfielder.

Club career
Born in Rojales, Alicante, Valencian Community, Gómez began his career with local Alicante CF, finishing his youth career with neighbours Villarreal CF. On 30 April 2011, not yet aged 17, he made his senior debut for the club's B team, against Gimnàstic de Tarragona in the Segunda División.

On 28 November 2011, Gómez played his first official game with the main squad – also his La Liga debut – coming on as a substitute for Jonathan de Guzmán in a 2–1 away defeat to Málaga CF. On 25 February of the following year he scored his first goal as a professional, helping to a 2–0 win at CD Guadalajara; both Villarreal teams, however, were relegated at the end of the season – the B's finished in 12th position, but were forced to drop down a level nonetheless.

Gómez contributed 24 matches and one goal in the 2012–13 campaign, as the Yellow Submarine was immediately promoted. He signed a new five-year contract in August 2013, and scored his first goal in the top tier on 13 January of the following year, starting in the 5–1 home victory over Real Sociedad.

On 9 July 2015, Gómez was loaned to fellow league team Getafe CF in a season-long deal. On 5 July of the following year, after suffering relegation, he agreed to a permanent four-year contract with Sporting de Gijón also of the top flight.

On 26 January 2018, Gómez moved to second division leaders SD Huesca on loan. After achieving promotion, the deal was extended for another season.

Gómez returned to his first club Villarreal on 18 July 2019, signing a four-year contract for a rumoured fee of €1.3 million. His debut came a month later, when he started and scored once in a 4–4 home draw against Granada CF.

Gómez made 11 appearances in his side's victorious run in the 2020–21 UEFA Europa League. This included 43 minutes of the final against Manchester United.

On 28 July 2022, Gómez joined CA Osasuna on a five-year deal for €1.8 million; an additional €100,000 bonus was added to this fee, for every season the team remained in the main division.

Career statistics

Club

Honours
Villarreal
UEFA Europa League: 2020–21

References

External links

1994 births
Living people
People from Vega Baja del Segura
Sportspeople from the Province of Alicante
Spanish footballers
Footballers from the Valencian Community
Association football midfielders
La Liga players
Segunda División players
Segunda División B players
Tercera División players
Villarreal CF C players
Villarreal CF B players
Villarreal CF players
Getafe CF footballers
Sporting de Gijón players
SD Huesca footballers
CA Osasuna players
UEFA Europa League winning players
Spain youth international footballers
Spain under-21 international footballers